Vilma Cecilia Morales Montalván (born 15 October 1954 in Puerto Cortés) is a Honduran lawyer. She was designated President of the Supreme Court of Honduras from 2002 to 2009.

In 2010, she was appointed president of the National Commission of Banks and Insurances.

References

1954 births
Living people
People from Puerto Cortés
20th-century Honduran lawyers
Presidents of the Supreme Court of Honduras
21st-century Honduran women politicians
21st-century Honduran politicians
21st-century women judges
Honduran judges